The Women's slalom competition at the FIS Alpine World Ski Championships 2023 was held at Roc de Fer ski course in Méribel on 18 February 2023.

Laurence St-Germain shocks gold and beaten Shiffrin.

Results
The first run was started at 10:00 and the second run at 13:30.

References

Women's slalom